Alex Haley House and Museum State Historic Site is one of the Tennessee Historical Commission's state-owned historic sites and is located in Henning, Tennessee, United States. It is open to the public and partially funded by an agreement with the Tennessee Historical Commission.  It was originally known as W. E. Palmer House and was the boyhood home of author Alex Haley.  He was buried on the grounds.  The home was listed on the National Register of Historic Places in 1978. In 2010, the site debuted the state-funded Alex Haley Museum and Interpretive Center which features a museum  and interpretive center (designed by architect Louis Pounders) with exhibitions covering Haley's life.

References

External links
Alex Haley Museum website
Alex Haley House and Museum – Tennessee State-Owned Historic Sites

Haley, Alex
Historic house museums in Tennessee
Houses completed in 1918
Houses in Lauderdale County, Tennessee
Haley, Alex, House And Museum
Haley, Alex
Museums in Lauderdale County, Tennessee
Tennessee State Historic Sites
National Register of Historic Places in Lauderdale County, Tennessee
African-American historic house museums